Žunovi is a village in the municipality of Sokolac, Bosnia and Herzegovina.

References

Populated places in Sokolac